Horgan is a surname of Irish origin. The origins of the name lie in County Cork, Ireland; the name translates to mean Warrior or Champion.

Notable people with the surname include:

Aisleyne Horgan-Wallace (born 1978), British model
Anthony Horgan (born 1976), Irish rugby footballer
Brendan Horgan, American businessman
Cara Horgan (born before 2004), English actress
Denis Horgan (1871–1922), Irish athlete
Goretti Horgan (born 1950s), Irish socialist activist
John Horgan (disambiguation), several people
Joe Horgan (born 1977), American baseball player
Mary Horgan, Irish physician
Michael C. Horgan (1846–1910), American Union Navy sailor
Neal Horgan (born 1979), Irish footballer
P. H. Horgan III (born 1960), American golfer
Pat Horgan (born 1957), Irish hurler
Patrick Horgan (born 1987), Irish hurler
Paul Horgan (1903–1995), American author
Richard Cornelius Horgan (1867-1942), musical theatre librettist (as Austen Hurgon)
Robbie Horgan (born 1968), Irish footballer
Séamus Horgan (born 1946), Irish hurler
Shane Horgan (born 1978), Irish rugby footballer
Sharon Horgan (born 1970), Irish writer
Siobhan Horgan (born 1978), Irish racing cyclist 
Stephen F. Horgan (born 1956), American businessman and entrepreneur
Stephen H. Horgan (1854–1941), American inventor
Tracy Horgan (born 1986), Canadian curler

Surnames
Surnames of Irish origin
Surnames of British Isles origin